Autoimmune retinopathy (AIR) is a rare disease in which the patient's immune system attacks proteins in the retina, leading to loss of eyesight. The disease is poorly understood, but may be the result of cancer or cancer chemotherapy. The disease is an autoimmune condition characterized by vision loss, blind spots, and visual field abnormalities. It can be divided into cancer-associated retinopathy (CAR) and melanoma-associated retinopathy (MAR). The condition is associated with retinal degeneration caused by autoimmune antibodies recognizing retinal proteins as antigens and targeting them. AIR's prevalence is extremely rare, with CAR being more common than MAR. It is more commonly diagnosed in females (approximately 60% of diagnosed patients are females) in the age range of 50–60.

Types

Cancer-associated retinopathy 

A division of AIR, cancer-associated retinopathy is a paraneoplastic syndrome, which is a disorder caused by an immune system response to an abnormality. Autoimmune antibodies target proteins in retinal photoreceptor cells. The proteins targeted as antigenic are recoverin, α‐enolase and transducin. This autoimmune response leads to photoreceptor cell death. It causes progressive vision loss that can lead to blindness. CAR is typically associated with the anti-recoverin antibody.

Melanoma-associated retinopathy 
Retinal bipolar cells (cells in retina that transmit signals) react with the antibodies, leading to cell death. Although it is less prevalent than CAR, diagnosed cases of MAR continue to increase while CAR numbers decrease.

Signs and symptoms 
Both CAR and MAR share the same symptoms. This is because they are both paraneoplastic syndromes.  AIR symptoms are numerous and shared by many other diseases.

Diagnosis 
Diagnosis of AIR can be difficult due to the overlap of symptoms with other disorders. Examination of the fundus (inner surface of eye) can show no results or it can show narrowing of the blood vessels, abnormal colouration of the optic disc, and retinal atrophy. Fundus examination results are not indicative of autoimmune retinopathy but they are used to initiate the diagnostic process. An electroretinogram (eye test used to see abnormalities in the retina) is used to detect AIR. An abnormal electroretinogram (ERG) with respect to light and dark adaptations indicates AIR. The ERG also allows differentiation between cancer-associated retinopathy and melanoma-associated retinopathy. If the ERG shows cone responses, CAR can be prematurely diagnosed. If the ERG shows a significant decrease in b-wave amplitude, MAR can be prematurely diagnosed. To confirm, analysis for anti-retinal antibodies through Western blotting of serum collected from the patient is done.

Treatment 
Due to the difficulty of diagnosis, managing this disease is a challenge. For this reason, there is no established treatment for AIR. Clinicians try to reduce and control the autoimmune system attack to prevent any irreversible retinal damage. Methods of treatment include intravenous immunoglobulin (IVIG), plasmapheresis, and corticosteroids.

Immunoglobulin 
Immunoglobulin samples are obtained from a large pool of healthy, matched donors (10000 - 20000). The immunoglobulin mixture is then administered through IV at a rate of 0.4g/kg/day for 5 days. Antibodies in the IVIG mixture interact with binding sites of the disease-associated antibodies (such as anti-recoverin antibodies). This prevents binding to proteins targeted as antigenic and reduces disease activity. Responses to this treatment can vary and are impacted if the patient is diagnosed with any type of cancer. Patients who respond positively show improvement in the clarity of their vision and their visual field.

Plasmapheresis 
Plasmapheresis involves separating blood into two parts - blood cells and plasma. The blood plasma components, such as the antibodies, are treated outside of the body. After removal of the disease-associated antibodies, the blood cells and plasma are transfused back into the body. Response to this treatment depends on how much retinal damage has been done. Patients who respond positively show significant visual gains.

Corticosteroids 
Corticosteroids are administered through IV or orally. They cause lymphocytopenia, a condition where white blood cell levels are abnormally low. Corticosteroids cause white blood cell death, lowering their numbers throughout the body. They also cause white blood cells to recirculate away from the area of damage (the retina). This minimizes damage caused by the antibodies produced by the white blood cells. Often, this is treatment is combined with plasmapheresis. Instead of treating the plasma and blood cells, they are replaced with a healthy donor mixture. Patients who respond positively show improved visual fields and an almost complete disappearance of anti-retinal antibodies.

References

Disorders of choroid and retina
Autoimmune diseases
Steroid-responsive inflammatory conditions